The 2020–21 Buffalo Sabres season was the 51st season for the National Hockey League franchise that was established on May 22, 1970.

On December 20, 2020, the league temporarily realigned into four divisions with no conferences due to the COVID-19 pandemic and the ongoing closure of the Canada–United States border. As a result of this realignment the Sabres played this season in the East Division and only played games against the other teams in their new division during the regular season.

With an 18th consecutive loss on March 29, 2021, the Sabres equalled the NHL record for the longest losing streak in a season, tied with the 2003–04 Pittsburgh Penguins. In that game, the Sabres blew a 3–0 lead and lost 4–3 in overtime.

On April 17, the Sabres were eliminated from playoff contention after a 3–2 loss to the Pittsburgh Penguins, extending their playoff drought to ten seasons, tying an NHL record.

In the Sabres' 18-game losing streak, they were 0-15-3 (two overtime losses and one shootout loss). In the first 34 games, they were 6-23-5 for 17 points. In their final 22 games, they were 9-11-2, ultimately finishing with a 15-34-7 record for 37 points. For the fourth time in eight seasons, the Sabres finished with the worst record in the whole NHL. During the last minutes of their penultimate game, an 8-4 road loss to the Pittsburgh Penguins, The New Year by Blind Witness was played, and they announced they would make that their theme song.

Off-season
The Sabres introduced three new jerseys for the season. On August 11, 2020, the Sabres revealed their new uniforms, which was an updated version of the team's original jerseys. The team reintroduced their original royal blue, gold, and white colors, which was worn by the team from 1970 to 1996. On November 16, 2020, the NHL introduced Adidas "Reverse Retro" jerseys for all 31 teams, which feature throwback uniforms with a modern twist. The Sabres' Reverse Retro jersey is a modern update to the team's first third jersey worn in 2000, with the exception being that it was done in the team's current colors on a white template.

Standings

Divisional standings

Schedule and results

Regular season
The regular season schedule was published on December 23, 2020.

Player statistics

Skaters

Goaltenders

†Denotes player spent time with another team before joining the Sabres. Stats reflect time with the Sabres only.
‡Denotes player was traded mid-season. Stats reflect time with the Sabres only.
Bold/italics denotes franchise record.

Transactions

Trades

Waivers

Free agents

Signings

Draft picks

Below are the Buffalo Sabres' selections at the 2020 NHL Entry Draft, which was originally scheduled for June 26–27, 2020 at the Bell Center in Montreal, but was postponed on March 25, 2020, due to the COVID-19 pandemic. It was held October 6–7, 2020 virtually via Video conference call from the NHL Network studio in Secaucus, New Jersey.

Notes:
 The San Jose Sharks' second-round pick went to the Buffalo Sabres as the result of a trade on October 7, 2020, that sent a second and fourth-round pick both in 2020 (38th and 100th overall) to San Jose in exchange for this pick.
 The Dallas Stars' seventh-round pick went to the Buffalo Sabres as the result of a trade on November 10, 2018, that sent Taylor Fedun to Dallas in exchange for this pick (being conditional at the time of the trade). The condition – Buffalo will receive a seventh-round pick in 2020 if Fedun plays in 25 games during the 2018–19 NHL season and 2019 Stanley Cup playoffs combined – was converted on January 17, 2019.

References

Buffalo Sabres
Buffalo Sabres seasons
Buffalo Sabres
Buffalo Sabres